Mount Aragorn is a  mountain summit located in the Cadwallader Range in southwestern British Columbia, Canada. Precipitation runoff from the peak drains into tributaries of the Fraser River.

History

The first ascent of the mountain was made in 1972 by Peter Jordan, Fred Thiessen, and Eric White. This climbing party also made the first ascents of nearby Mount Gandalf and Mount Shadowfax. The names Aragorn, Gandalf, and Shadowfax were taken from fictional characters in the novels The Hobbit and The Lord of the Rings by J. R. R. Tolkien, which were read while waiting out stormy weather during the 1972 outing. The mountain's name was proposed in 1978 by Karl Ricker of the Alpine Club of Canada, and was officially adopted January 23, 1979, by the Geographical Names Board of Canada.

Climate

Based on the Köppen climate classification, Mount Aragorn is located in a subarctic climate zone of western North America. Most weather fronts originate in the Pacific Ocean, and travel east toward the Coast Mountains where they are forced upward by the range (Orographic lift), causing them to drop their moisture in the form of rain or snowfall. As a result, the Coast Mountains experience high precipitation, especially during the winter months in the form of snowfall. Temperatures can drop below −20 °C with wind chill factors below −30 °C. The months July through September offer the most favorable weather for climbing Mount Aragorn.

Climbing Routes

Established climbing routes on Mount Aragorn:
   
 North Face -  
 East Ridge -  
 South Couloir - 
 South Ridge
 South Pillar -

See also

 Geography of British Columbia
 Geology of British Columbia

References

External links
 Weather forecast: Mount Aragorn

Two-thousanders of British Columbia
Pacific Ranges
Lillooet Land District